Miss Advised is an American reality documentary television series that debuted on June 18, 2012, on Bravo in the United States. The series follows three single relationship experts – Emily Morse, Amy Laurent, and Julia Allison – as they provide dating advice but struggle to make their own love lives work.

Episodes

References

2010s American reality television series
2012 American television series debuts
2012 American television series endings
English-language television shows
Bravo (American TV network) original programming
American dating and relationship reality television series